Silas Daniels III (born September 22, 1981, in Jacksonville, Florida is a professional American football wide receiver who is currently a free agent. Daniels attended Jean Ribault High School, where he was an honorable mention his senior year for USA Today's 1999 Florida Player of the year honor. He signed with Auburn in 2000 and enjoyed four successful years with the Tigers football team including their 2004 undefeated season. Daniels played in a total of 42 games (2001 through 2004) for Auburn, and held the longest touchdown reception in Auburn history (an 87-yard pass from Jason Campbell in a 2004 matchup versus Louisiana Tech University) until a 94-yard connection from Cam Newton to Emory Blake in 2010 against Louisiana-Monroe. He entered the 2005 NFL Draft but was not selected, and subsequently was briefly signed to the Saskatchewan Roughriders of the Canadian Football League. Daniels signed in December 2005 to play indoor football with the Montgomery Maulers of the NIFL. The team changed their name to the Bears and moved into the AIFA, but Daniels is still listed on their roster for the 2007 season. Daniels is 6'0", 190 lbs and runs a 4.40 second 40-meter dash. In 2007, Daniels signed with the Columbus Lions of the AIFA, but was sidelined with a leg injury. Daniels came back strong for the Lions in 2008, with 68 receptions, 900 yards, and 21 touchdown season. Daniels is currently in his second season with the Harrisburg Stampede AIFA. He also made the 2009 All-AIFA All-pro team with 37 receptions, 458 yards, 7 touchdowns. Daniels also started 6 games at Defensive Back and totaled 20 tackles, 2 Pass Breakups, 3 Interceptions. In 2010, Daniels helped the Stampede make a big turnaround compiling a 12–4 record and the first playoff appearance in franchise history. Despite missing 5 games with a broken hand, Daniels still made 2010 AIFA allstar with 53 catches 563 yards 12 touchdowns 16 tackles 1 interception and 1 fumble recovery.

References

External links
Scout.com Player Profile
NFL Draft Tracker Player Page
USA Today 1999 Player of the Year
Player College Stats @ PFR

1981 births
Living people
Auburn Tigers football players
Columbus Lions players
Harrisburg Stampede players